Major prion protein (PrP), is encoded in the human by the PRNP gene also known as  CD230 (cluster of differentiation 230). Expression of the protein is most predominant in the nervous system but occurs in many other tissues throughout the body.

The protein can exist in multiple isoforms: the normal PrPC form, and the protease-resistant form designated PrPRes such as the disease-causing PrPSc(scrapie) and an isoform located in mitochondria. The misfolded version PrPSc is associated with a variety of cognitive disorders and neurodegenerative diseases such as in animals: ovine scrapie, bovine spongiform encephalopathy (BSE, mad cow disease), feline spongiform encephalopathy, transmissible mink encephalopathy (TME), exotic ungulate encephalopathy, chronic wasting disease (CWD) which affects cervids; and in humans: Creutzfeldt–Jakob disease (CJD), fatal familial insomnia (FFI), Gerstmann–Sträussler–Scheinker syndrome (GSS), kuru, and variant Creutzfeldt–Jakob disease (vCJD). Similarities exist between kuru, thought to be due to human ingestion of diseased individuals, and vCJD, thought to be due to human ingestion of BSE-tainted cattle products.

Gene 

The human PRNP gene is located on the short (p) arm of chromosome 20 between the end (terminus) of the arm and position 13, from base pair 4,615,068 to base pair 4,630,233.

Structure 

PrP is highly conserved through mammals, lending credence to application of conclusions from test animals such as mice. Comparison between primates is especially similar, ranging from 92.9-99.6% similarity in amino acid sequences. The human protein structure consists of a globular domain with three α-helices and a two-strand antiparallel β-sheet, an NH2-terminal tail, and a short COOH-terminal tail. A glycophosphatidylinositol (GPI) membrane anchor at the COOH-terminal tethers PrP to cell membranes, and this proves to be integral to the transmission of conformational change; secreted PrP lacking the anchor component is unaffected by the infectious isoform.

The primary sequence of PrP is 253 amino acids long before post-translational modification. Signal sequences in the amino- and carboxy- terminal ends are removed posttranslationally, resulting in a mature length of 208 amino acids. For human and golden hamster PrP, two glycosylated sites exist on helices 2 and 3 at Asn181 and Asn197. Murine PrP has glycosylation sites as Asn180 and Asn196. A disulfide bond exists between Cys179 of the second helix and Cys214 of the third helix (human PrPC numbering).

PrP messenger RNA contains a pseudoknot structure (prion pseudoknot), which is thought to be involved in regulation of PrP protein translation.

Ligand-binding 

The mechanism for conformational conversion to the scrapie isoform is speculated to be an elusive ligand-protein, but, so far, no such compound has been identified. However, a large body of research has developed on candidates and their interaction with the PrPC.

Copper, zinc, manganese, and nickel are confirmed PrP ligands that bind to its octarepeat region. Ligand binding causes a conformational change with unknown effect. Heavy metal binding at PrP has been linked to resistance to oxidative stress arising from heavy metal toxicity.

PrPC (normal cellular) isoform 

Although the precise function of PrP is not yet known, it is possibly involved in the transport of ionic copper to cells from the surrounding environment. Researchers have also proposed roles for PrP in cell signaling or in the formation of synapses. PrPC attaches to the outer surface of the cell membrane by a glycosylphosphatidylinositol anchor at its C-terminal Ser231.

Prion protein contains five octapeptide repeats with sequence PHGGGWGQ (though the first repeat has the slightly-modified, histidine-deficient sequence PQGGGGWGQ). This is thought to generate a copper-binding domain via nitrogen atoms in the histidine imidazole side-chains and deprotonated amide nitrogens from the 2nd and 3rd glycines in the repeat. The ability to bind copper is, therefore, pH-dependent. NMR shows copper binding results in a conformational change at the N-terminus.

PrPSc (scrapie) isoform 

PrPSc is a conformational isoform of PrPC, but this orientation tends to accumulate in compact, protease-resistant aggregates within neural tissue. The abnormal PrPSc isoform has a different secondary and tertiary structure from PrPC, but identical primary sequence. Circular dichroism shows that normal PrPC has 42% alpha helical and 3% beta sheet content, whereas PrPSc is only 30% alpha helix and 43% beta sheet. However, the presence of alpha helices in infectious PrPSc has come into question, with current models proposing a lack of alpha helices altogether, replaced instead with a total beta sheet composition. This refolding renders the PrPSc isoform extremely resistant to proteolysis.

The propagation of PrPSc is a topic of great interest, as its accumulation is a pathological cause of neurodegeneration. Based on the progressive nature of spongiform encephalopathies, the predominant hypothesis posits that the change from normal PrPC is caused by the presence and interaction with PrPSc. Strong support for this is taken from studies in which PRNP-knockout mice are resistant to the introduction of PrPSc. Despite widespread acceptance of the conformation conversion hypothesis, some studies mitigate claims for a direct link between PrPSc and cytotoxicity.

Polymorphisms at sites 136, 154, and 171 are associated with varying susceptibility to ovine scrapie. (These ovine sites correspond to human sites 133, 151, and 168.) Polymorphisms of the PrP-VRQ form and PrP-ARQ form are associated with increased susceptibility, whereas PrP-ARR is associated with resistance. The National Scrapie Plan of the UK aims to breed out these scrapie polymorphisms by increasing the frequency of the resistant allele. However, PrP-ARR polymorphisms are susceptible to atypical scrapie, so this may prove unfruitful.

Function

Nervous system 

The strong association to neurodegenerative diseases raises many questions of the function of PrP in the brain. A common approach is using PrP-knockout and transgenic mice to investigate deficiencies and differences. Initial attempts produced two strains of PrP-null mice that show no physiological or developmental differences when subjected to an array of tests. However, more recent strains have shown significant cognitive abnormalities.

As the null mice age, a marked loss of Purkinje cells in the cerebellum results in decreased motor coordination. However, this effect is not a direct result of PrP's absence, and rather arises from increased Doppel gene expression. Other observed differences include reduced stress response and increased exploration of novel environments.

Circadian rhythm is altered in null mice. Fatal familial insomnia is thought to be the result of a point mutation in PRNP at codon 178, which corroborates PrP's involvement in sleep-wake cycles. In addition, circadian regulation has been demonstrated in PrP mRNA, which cycles regularly with day-night.

Memory 

While null mice exhibit normal learning ability and short-term memory, long-term memory consolidation deficits have been demonstrated. As with ataxia, this is attributable to Doppel gene expression. However, spatial learning, a predominantly hippocampal-function, is decreased in the null mice and can be recovered with the reinstatement of PrP in neurons; this indicates that loss of PrP function is the cause. The interaction of hippocampal PrP with laminin (LN) is pivotal in memory processing and is likely modulated by the kinases PKA and ERK1/2.

Further support for PrP's role in memory formation is derived from several population studies. A test of healthy young humans showed increased long-term memory ability associated with an MM or MV genotype when compared to VV. Down syndrome patients with a single valine substitution have been linked to earlier cognitive decline. Several polymorphisms in PRNP have been linked with cognitive impairment in the elderly as well as earlier cognitive decline. All of these studies investigated differences in codon 129, indicating its importance in the overall functionality of PrP, in particular with regard to memory.

Neurons and synapses 

PrP is present in both the pre- and post-synaptic compartments, with the greatest concentration in the pre-synaptic portion. Considering this and PrP's suite of behavioral influences, the neural cell functions and interactions are of particular interest. Based on the copper ligand, one proposed function casts PrP as a copper buffer for the synaptic cleft. In this role, the protein could serve as either a copper homeostasis mechanism, a calcium modulator, or a sensor for copper or oxidative stress. Loss of PrP function has been linked to long-term potentiation (LTP). This effect can be positive or negative and is due to changes in neuronal excitability and synaptic transmission in the hippocampus.

Some research indicates PrP involvement in neuronal development, differentiation, and neurite outgrowth. The PrP-activated signal transduction pathway is associated with axon and dendritic outgrowth with a series of kinases.

Immune system 

Though most attention is focused on PrP's presence in the nervous system, it is also abundant in immune system tissue. PrP immune cells include hematopoietic stem cells, mature lymphoid and myeloid compartments, and certain lymphocytes; also, it has been detected in natural killer cells, platelets, and monocytes. T cell activation is accompanied by a strong up-regulation of PrP, though it is not requisite. The lack of immunoresponse to transmissible spongiform encephalopathies (TSE), neurodegenerative diseases caused by prions, could stem from the tolerance for PrPSc.

Muscles, liver, and pituitary 

PrP-null mice provide clues to a role in muscular physiology when subjected to a forced swimming test, which showed reduced locomotor activity. Aging mice with an overexpression of PRNP showed significant degradation of muscle tissue.

Though present, very low levels of PrP exist in the liver and could be associated with liver fibrosis. Presence in the pituitary has been shown to affect neuroendocrine function in amphibians, but little is known concerning mammalian pituitary PrP.

Cellular 

Varying expression of PrP through the cell cycle has led to speculation on involvement in development. A wide range of studies has been conducted investigating the role in cell proliferation, differentiation, death, and survival. Engagement of PrP has been linked to activation of signal transduction.

Modulation of signal transduction pathways has been demonstrated in cross-linking with antibodies and ligand-binding (hop/STI1 or copper). Given the diversity of interactions, effects, and distribution, PrP has been proposed as dynamic surface protein functioning in signaling pathways. Specific sites along the protein bind other proteins, biomolecules, and metals. These interfaces allow specific sets of cells to communicate based on level of expression and the surrounding microenvironment. The anchoring on a GPI raft in the lipid bilayer supports claims of an extracellular scaffolding function.

Diseases caused by PrP misfolding 

More than 20 mutations in the PRNP gene have been identified in people with inherited prion diseases, which include the following:
 Creutzfeldt–Jakob disease – glutamic acid-200 is replaced by lysine while valine is present at amino acid 129
 Gerstmann–Sträussler–Scheinker syndrome – usually a change in codon 102 from proline to leucine
 fatal familial insomnia – aspartic acid-178 is replaced by asparagine while methionine is present at amino acid 129

The conversion of PrPC to PrPSc conformation is the mechanism of transmission of fatal, neurodegenerative transmissible spongiform encephalopathies (TSE). This can arise from genetic factors, infection from external source, or spontaneously for reasons unknown. Accumulation of PrPSc corresponds with progression of neurodegeneration and is the proposed cause. Some PRNP mutations lead to a change in single amino acids (the building-blocks of proteins) in the prion protein. Others insert additional amino acids into the protein or cause an abnormally short protein to be made. These mutations cause the cell to make prion proteins with an abnormal structure. The abnormal protein PrPSc accumulates in the brain and destroys nerve cells, which leads to the mental and behavioral features of prion diseases.

Several other changes in the PRNP gene (called polymorphisms) do not cause prion diseases but may affect a person's risk of developing these diseases or alter the course of the disorders. An allele that codes for a PRNP variant, G127V, provides resistance to kuru.

In addition, some prion diseases can be transmitted from external sources of PrPSc.
 Scrapie – fatal neurodegenerative disease in sheep, not transmissible to humans
 Bovine spongiform encephalopathy (mad-cow disease) – fatal neurodegenerative disease in cows, which can be transmitted to humans by ingestion of brain, spinal, or digestive tract tissue of an infected cow
 Kuru – TSE in humans, transmitted via funerary cannibalism. Generally, affected family members were given, by tradition, parts of the central nervous system according to ritual when consuming deceased family members.

Alzheimer's disease 

PrPC protein is one of several cellular receptors of soluble amyloid beta (Aβ) oligomers, which are canonically implicated in causing Alzheimer's disease. These oligomers are composed smaller Aβ plaques, and are the most damaging to the integrity of a neuron. The precise mechanism of soluble Aβ oligomers directly inducing neurotoxicity is unknown, and experimental deletion of PRNP in animals has yielded several conflicting findings. When Aβ oligomers were injected into the cerebral ventricles of a mouse model of Alzheimer's, PRNP deletion did not offer protection, only anti-PrPC antibodies prevented long-term memory and spatial learning deficits. This would suggest either an unequal relation between PRNP and Aβ oligomer-mediated neurodegeneration or a site-specific relational significance. In the case of direct injection of Aβ oligomers into the hippocampus, PRNP-knockout mice were found to be indistinguishable from control with respect to both neuronal death rates and measurements of synaptic plasticity. It was further found that Aβ-oligomers bind to PrPC at the postsynaptic density, indirectly overactivating the NMDA receptor via the Fyn enzyme, resulting in excitotoxicity. Soluble Aβ oligomers also bind to PrPC at the dendritic spines, forming a complex with Fyn and excessively activating tau, another protein implicated in Alzheimer's. As the gene FYN codes for the enzyme Fyn, FYN-knockout mice display neither excitotoxic events nor dendritic spine shrinkage when injected with Aβ oligomers. In mammals, the full functional significance of PRNP remains unclear, as PRNP deletion has been prophylactically implemented by the cattle industry without apparent harm. In mice, this same deletion phenotypically varies between Alzheimer's mouse lines, as hAPPJ20 mice and TgCRND8 mice show a slight increase in epileptic activity, contributing to conflicting results when examining Alzheimer's survival rates. Of note, the deletion of PRNP in both APPswe and SEN1dE9, two other transgenic models of Alzheimer's, attenuated the epilepsy-induced death phenotype seen in a subset of these animals. Taken collectively, recent evidence suggests PRNP may be important for conducing the neurotoxic effects of soluble Aβ-oligomers and the emergent disease state of Alzheimer's.

In humans, the methionine/valine polymorphism at codon 129 of PRNP (rs1799990) is most closely associated with Alzheimer's disease. Variant V allele carriers (VV and MV) show a 13% decreased risk with respect to developing Alzheimer's compared to the methionine homozygote (MM). However, the protective effects of variant V carriers have been found exclusively in Caucasians. The decreased risk in V allele carriers is further limited to late-onset Alzheimer's disease only (≥ 65 years). PRNP can also functionally interact with polymorphisms in two other genes implicated in Alzheimer's, PSEN1 and APOE, to compound risk for both Alzheimer's and sporadic Creutzfeldt–Jakob disease. A point mutation on codon 102 of PRNP at least in part contributed to three separate patients' atypical frontotemporal dementia within the same family, suggesting a new phenotype for Gerstmann–Sträussler–Scheinker syndrome. The same study proposed sequencing PRNP in cases of ambiguously diagnosed dementia, as the various forms of dementia can prove challenging to differentially diagnose.

Interactions 

A strong interaction exists between PrP and the cochaperone Hop (Hsp70/Hsp90 organizing protein; also called STI1 (Stress-induced protein 1)).

References

External links 
 PRNP (PrP) gene at GeneCard
 
 Susan Lindquist's Seminar: "The Surprising World of Prion Biology"

Clusters of differentiation
Amyloidosis